Emma Hughes (born 13 November 2000) is an Australian cricketer who plays as a right-arm medium bowler and right-handed batter. She plays for the Sydney Sixers in the Women's Big Bash League (WBBL). She played in two matches for the team in the 2020–21 Women's Big Bash League season. She also joined the New South Wales Breakers ahead of the 2020–21 Women's National Cricket League season.

References

External links
 
 

2000 births
Australian women cricketers
Living people
New South Wales Breakers cricketers
Sydney Sixers (WBBL) cricketers
Place of birth missing (living people)